Maheswari is a 1955 Indian Tamil language film produced by Modern Theatres and directed by T. R. Raghunath. The film stars Gemini Ganesan and Savithri. It was released on 13 November 1955.

Plot 
Manickam is wanted by the army of East India Company. He is absconding and takes refuge in the house of Maheswari. Manickam and Maheswari fall in love with each other. Manickam's father Dharmalingam demands a large dowry from Maheswari's mother, Kanthimathi, who somehow manages to give the amount. However, Dharmalingam learns that Kanthimathi is ridiculed by the villagers as a woman of loose moral character. So, he sends back Maheswari to her home. Manickam is helpless because he depends on his father for everything. Kanthimathi kills herself. Maheswari starts looking for a means to earn a living and she comes across Mayathevan, the leader of a gang of robbers who is wanted by the East India Company. She is employed by him as chief assistant. Mayathevan renames Maheswari as Rani Rangamma. Though she lives like a queen, her heart yearns for Manickam. In the meantime, at the insistence of his father, Manickam has married another woman. What happens to Maheswari forms the rest of the story.

Cast 
 Savitri as Maheswari
 Gemini Ganesan as Manickam
 K. A. Thangavelu as Dharmalingam, Manickam's father
 Saradamba as Kanthimathi, Maheswari's mother
 N. S. Narayana Pillai as Mayathevan
 M. N. Rajam
 A. Karunanidhi
 C. K. Saraswathi as Kamakshi, Dharmalingam's wife
 P. Dhanam
 O. A. K. Thevar
 T. P. Muthulakshmi
Dance
 Lakshmikantha

Soundtrack 
Music was composed by G. Ramanathan while the lyrics were penned by M. K. Athmanathan, A. Maruthakasi and Pattukkottai Kalyanasundaram. Playback singers are: M. L. Vasanthakumari, Jikki, T. V. Rathnam, A. G. Rathnamala, A. M. Rajah and S. C. Krishnan.

Telugu
For the Telugu-dubbed version Rani Rangamma, the music was composed by S. Dakshinamurthi. Lyrics were by Sri Sri and Aarudhra. Playback singers are P. B. Sreenivas, Pithapuram Nageswara Rao, R. Balasaraswathi Devi, S. Janaki, Swarnalatha & T. Sathyavathi.

All the tunes for all the songs for both languages are the same.

Reception 
Maheswari was released on 13 November 1955, and was not a commercial success during its original release.

References

External links 

1950s Tamil-language films
Films directed by T. R. Raghunath
Films scored by G. Ramanathan
Films with screenplays by C. V. Sridhar